Julio Acosta González (born July 22, 1987) is a Cuban-born Chilean weightlifter. He placed 11th in the men's 62 kg category at the 2016 Summer Olympics.

References

1987 births
Living people
Chilean male weightlifters
Olympic weightlifters of Chile
Weightlifters at the 2016 Summer Olympics
Naturalized citizens of Chile